The 2017 Sibiu Open was a professional tennis tournament played on clay courts. It was the sixth edition of the tournament which was part of the 2017 ATP Challenger Tour. It took place in Sibiu, Romania between 18 and 24 September 2017.

Singles main-draw entrants

Seeds

 1 Rankings are as of 11 September 2017.

Other entrants
The following players received wildcards into the singles main draw:
  Vlad Andrei Dancu
  Michał Dembek
  Nino Serdarušić
  Adrian Ungur

The following players received entry from the qualifying draw:
  Matteo Donati
  Lenny Hampel
  Alexandar Lazov
  Alexandre Müller

The following player received entry as a lucky loser:
  Dimitar Kuzmanov

Champions

Singles

 Cedrik-Marcel Stebe def.  Carlos Taberner 6–3, 6–3.

Doubles

 Marco Cecchinato /  Matteo Donati def.  Sander Gillé /  Joran Vliegen 6–3, 6–1.

External links
Official Website

Sibiu Open
2017
2017 in Romanian tennis
September 2017 sports events in Romania